SciGirls is an American live-action/animated children's television series that premiered on February 11, 2010 on PBS Kids. It has a mix of live-action and animated segments. It is produced by Twin Cities PBS and builds on the "real kids doing real science" approach of DragonflyTV.

It is an educational outreach program for elementary school children based on proven best practices for: science, technology, engineering and math (STEM) education for girls. It was launched in February 2010 and produced by Twin Cities Public Television, the episodes are broadcast on most PBS stations and the project's website, SciGirls, is designed to encourage girls to pursue STEM careers, in response to the low numbers of women in many scientific careers. A sixth season themed around NASA been confirmed and completed, and it premiered on February 3, 2023.

Overview
Each episode depicts the STEM-themed activities of a group of middle-school girls including engineering a mini-wind farm, creating a turtle habitat, designing an electronic dress, and more.  Additionally, women scientists and engineers mentor the girls, demonstrating that interest in STEM subjects can lead to a rewarding lifelong pursuit.  The series is unified by two animated characters, Izzie and Jake, who emphasize how science and technology can help solve problems in everyday life. These characters also appear on the series website, integrated into the TV episodes.

Episodes

Characters
 Izzie (voiced by Lara Jill Miller) is a 12-year-old girl with a constantly expanding assortment of interests. She also acts as the webmaster for the SciGirls website, which hosts a database of science videos following real-life SciGirls. This resource often comes in handy, because whenever Izzie encounters a tricky situation, she can zap herself into her computer and follow along with the girls' investigations.  Afterward, she is easily able to design a solution to her dilemma.
 Jake (voiced by Greg Cipes) has known Izzie since they were in preschool and has remained her closest friend. He usually meets up with Izzie at school, online, or around the town. Jake finds himself drawn into Izzie's scientific situations more often than not.
Fang, Jake's pet mouse, can often be found helping Jake and Izzie on their STEM-filled adventures.
Alongside Izzie and Jake, each episode features a group of real girls (not actors) working alongside a woman STEM professional.

References

External links 
 Official Website on PBSkids.org
 PBS Parents Website
 SciGirls Outreach Website for Educators
 SciGirls Channel on YouTube

2010 American television series debuts
2010s American animated television series
2020s American animated television series
2010s American children's television series
2020s American children's television series
2010s American reality television series
2020s American reality television series
American children's animated education television series
American children's reality television series
American flash animated television series
American television series revived after cancellation
American television series with live action and animation
Animated television series about children
English-language television shows
Middle school television series
PBS Kids shows
PBS original programming
Science education television series
Television series by Soup2Nuts